Alice Bertha Clayden (1881−1958) was a British police officer.

Life
She had three brothers in London Metropolitan Police and when all but twenty of that force's women police were dismissed in 1922 Clayden was put in charge of them, becoming the first attested female officer to hold the rank of Inspector. When Dorothy Peto was appointed Superintendent in charge of women police in 1930, Clayden remained as Woman Inspector at Bow Street. On 30 April 1934 she was promoted to Sub-Divisional Inspector, the first (and possibly only) woman to hold that rank, and became deputy to Peto at Scotland Yard. She seems to have eventually reached the rank of Chief Inspector. A motherly woman, her officers considered her to be far more approachable than the austere Peto. She retired in 1930.

References

Women Metropolitan Police officers
1881 births
1958 deaths
Metropolitan Police officers